Church of St. Nicholas was a Serbian Orthodox church located in the village of Đurakovac in the municipality of Istok, in Kosovo. It was built on the foundations of an older building from the 14th century, and completely rebuilt in 1592 by the villagers, led by the priest Cvetko. The church belongs to the Eparchy of Raška and Prizren of the Serbian Orthodox Church and is registered as a Cultural Heritage of Serbia.

The church in Đurakovac was a single-nave building of modest dimensions, constructed by roughly cut quarry stone and limestone. The roof was covered with stone slabs and the average frescoes, painted by "sinful zograph Milija". The frescoes were restored in 1863. The church was much like those in the valley of the White Drin and represented a rare combination of stone and wood.

After the arrival of the Italian KFOR troops, the church was damaged, dynamited and demolished in July 1999 by Kosovo Albanians. The royal doors and two icons of the iconostasis, were lifted from the debris, and kept in the Patriarchal Monastery of Peć.

See also
Destruction of Serbian heritage in Kosovo

References

External links 
  
 The list of destroyed and desecrated churches in Kosovo and Metohija June-October 1999 (Списак уништених и оскрнављених цркава на Косову и Метохији јун-октобар 1999)
 Republic Institute for Protection of Cultural Monuments - Belgrade (Републички завод за заштиту споменика културе - Београд)
 The monuments' list (Листа споменика)

Serbian Orthodox church buildings in Kosovo
Destroyed churches in Kosovo
14th-century Serbian Orthodox church buildings
Persecution of Serbs
1592 establishments in Europe
Istog
Cultural heritage of Kosovo
Cultural Monuments of Exceptional Importance (Serbia)